RGV may refer to:

 Ram Gopal Varma (born 1962), an Indian film director, screenwriter and producer known as RGV
 Ratnagotravibhāga, a compendium of tathāgatagarbha literature
 Rio Grande Valley, a geographical region of the U.S. state of Texas
 Suzuki motorcycles RGV250 and RGV500
 A high-speed train, see Euroduplex